Sabrina Delhoum (born 21 May 1976) is an Algerian former footballer who played as a midfielder. She has been a member of the Algeria women's national team.

Club career
Delhoum has played for ASE Alger Centre in Algeria.

International career
Delhoum capped for Algeria at senior level during two Africa Women Cup of Nations editions (2006 and 2010).

References

1976 births
Living people
People from Annaba
Algerian women's footballers
Women's association football midfielders
Algeria women's international footballers
21st-century Algerian people